Asmita Gardens is a residential complex located in Bucharest. At , the 25 floor tower T3 is the tallest residential building in Bucharest.

The first three towers (5, 6 and 7) which have a city view were completed in April 2009, and the other four towers (1, 2, 3 and 4), 2×16 fl, 1×20 fl and 1×25 fl, which have a river view were completed in September 2009.

As of April 2016, 444 apartments were sold and 314 were still available.

References

External links
Official site

Residential buildings completed in 2009
Residential skyscrapers in Bucharest